Li Chengpeng (born September 22, 1968) is a prominent writer and social critic in the People's Republic of China. Well known in China for his reportage and social commentary—Li's Sina Weibo blog had nearly six million followers — (it is offline now) Li made international headlines in 2011 when he announced that he would seek political office as an independent candidate in his hometown of Chengdu, Sichuan province. While not technically illegal, the decision represented a rare and bold move in a country where candidates for political office are typically appointed by the Communist Party of China.

Career
Li, nicknamed "Li Da Yan" ("big-eyed Li"), began his career as a journalist and first rose to prominence for covering on corruption within China's professional soccer establishment. Li later coauthored a book on the subject, Chinese Soccer: The Inside Story, which documented allegations of pervasive match-fixing involving coaches, players, referees and officials. The book asserted that nearly every professional Chinese soccer player had faced varying degrees of pressure or coercion by gambling syndicates to participate in fixing games. He says his coverage of the issue prompted persistent and anonymous threats against him and his family.

His profile grew in the aftermath of the 2008 Sichuan earthquake. Having experienced the tremors in his apartment in Chengdu, Li committed himself to assisting in rescue efforts in the areas most severely impacted. He traveled to the Sichaun earthquake region as a volunteer and wrote an essay: "The True Story of the Miracle Survival of the Students and Teachers of Longhan Elementary School in Beichuan". He also published a novel titled, Li Kele Protests Demolitions in 2011, which took a critical look at forced demolitions in China.

In 2011, Li announced he would be running as an independent candidate to serve in the People's Congress of Wuhou district, Chengdu. Although China's constitution protects the rights of any citizens over the age of 18 to vote and run for local election, in practice these positions are generally filled by Communist Party-appointed candidates. Individuals who attempt to run as independents or self-nominated candidates sometimes face repercussions.  A number of prominent cultural figures, writers, and academics endorsed Li's candidacy including blogger Han Han, film director Feng Xiaogang, and legal scholar Yu Jianrong and He Weifang.

See also
Zhou Decai

References

External links
"Watermelon vendor died pursuing the Chinese dream", Translated essay by Li Chengpeng

1968 births
Living people
Chinese dissidents
Chinese sportswriters
Sportspeople from Xinjiang
People's Republic of China essayists
Writers from Xinjiang
Chinese bloggers
People from Hami